Nukabad-e Janglian (also Romanized as Nūkābād-e Janglīān) is a village in Pir Sohrab Rural District, in the Central District of Chabahar County, Sistan and Baluchestan Province, Iran. At the 2006 census, its population was 54, in 10 families.

References 

Populated places in Chabahar County